XHCTMX-TDT is a full-power television station in Mexico City, Mexico, broadcasting in digital on UHF channel 29. It is licensed to Cadena Tres I, S.A. de C.V, which is owned by Grupo Empresarial Ángeles (GEA), a company headed by Olegario Vázquez Raña and directed by Olegario Vázquez Aldir, through its Grupo Imagen communications unit.

It is the flagship station of the Imagen Televisión national network.

History 
On March 11, 2015, Cadena Tres I, S.A. de C.V., along with Grupo Radio Centro, S.A.B. de C.V., were declared the two winning bidders in the IFT-1 bidding process, which had as its aim the creation of two new national television networks, with 123 transmitters each. While Radio Centro ultimately declined to continue and only paid the security deposit, Cadena Tres I paid 1.808 billion pesos and received its concessions.

On July 22, 2016, the technical specifications for XHCTMX-TDT were issued by the IFT, for a 295 kW station to broadcast from the same tower on Cerro del Chiquihuite that houses Imagen's XHTRES-TDT and FM stations XEDA-FM and XHDL-FM. On August 19, the station came on air for the first time, with color bars and tone, and PSIP information indicating its callsign and virtual channel (XHCTMX, 3.1).

On October 17, 2016, at 8:00 p.m., Imagen Televisión started regular broadcasting.

Digital multiplex 

In 2017, multiplexing was authorized in signals 3.2 and 3.3, but it was not carried out. On July 10, 2020, the Imagen Multicast/Excelsior TV signal was added after being on XHTRES

References

External links 
  
 Grupo Imagen's official website 

Television stations in Mexico City
Grupo Imagen
Television channels and stations established in 2016